Trogodendron fasciculatum or the yellowhorned clerid is a small beetle of the family Cleridae (checkered beetles). T. fasciculatum is native to Australia, and feeds on other insects.

References

Cleridae
Beetles of Australia
Beetles described in 1802